Events in the year 2018 in Uzbekistan.

Incumbents
 President: Shavkat Mirziyoyev
 Prime Minister: Abdulla Aripov

Events

Sports 

9 to 25 February – Uzbekistan participated at the 2018 Winter Olympics in PyeongChang, South Korea, with 2 competitors in 2 sports, alpine skiing and figure skating. 

9 to 18 March – Uzbekistan participated at the 2018 Winter Paralympics in PyeongChang, South Korea

Deaths

20 March – Dilbar Abdurahmonova, musician, People's Artist of the USSR (b. 1936).

25 April – Shuhrat Abbosov, actor, film director, screenwriter and film producer (b. 1931)

17 August – Halima Xudoyberdiyeva, writer and poet (b. 1947).

References

 
2010s in Uzbekistan
Years of the 21st century in Uzbekistan
Uzbekistan
Uzbekistan